Krasiński (sometimes spelled Krasinsky, if originally transliterated from Russian, Ukrainian or Belarusian) is a surname of Polish, or generally Slavic, origin.

In its feminine version, the Polish surname becomes Krasińska, and the Russian or Belarusian surname may become Krasinskaya.

Krasiński family

Krasiński family is a Polish noble family. Notable members of the Krasiński family may include:
 Adam Stanisław Krasiński (1714–1800), Polish noble and bishop
 Elżbieta Krasińska-Jaraczewska (1791–1832), Polish writer
 Franciszka Krasińska (1742–1796), Polish noblewoman and wife of Charles of Saxony, Duke of Courland
 Jan Dobrogost Krasiński (1639–1717), Polish noble and politician
 Jan Kazimierz Krasiński (1607–1669), Polish noble and courtier
 Jan Krasiński (1756–1790), Polish noble and military commander
 Ludwik Krasiński (1609–1644), Polish noble and military commander
 Kazimierz Krasiński (1725–1802), Count, Polish noble, politician and patron of arts
 Maria Ludwika Krasińska (1883–1958), Polish noble, major heiress
 Marya Krasińska (1850–1884), Polish noble and landowner
 Michał Hieronim Krasiński (1712–1784), Polish noble and politician
 Stanisław Krasiński (c. 1558 – 1617), Polish noble and governor
 Stanisław Krasiński (1585–1649), Polish-Lithuanian nobleman, jurist, member of parliament
 Walerian Krasiński (1795–1855), Polish historian and jurnalist
 Wincenty Krasiński (1782–1858), Count, Polish noble, military commander, senator, father of the poet Zygmunt Krasiński
 Władysław Krasiński (1844–1873), Count, Polish noble, son of the poet Zygmunt Krasiński
 Zofia Krasińska (died 1642 or 1643), Polish noble lady
 Zygmunt Krasiński (1812–1859), Polish romantic poet

Other people named Krasinski / Krasinsky
 Georgij A. Krasinsky (1939–2011), Russian astronomer
 John Krasinski (born 1979), American actor
 Mathilde Kschessinska (1872–1971), Russian prima ballerina of Polish origin, a.k.a. Princess Romanova-Krasinskaya

See also
5714 Krasinsky, a minor planet named after Georgij Al'bertovich Krasinsky
Krasiński Palace,  a baroque palace on Krasiński Square in Warsaw, Poland
Krasiński Square, a square in the central district of Warsaw, Poland
Krasiński Library, a former library in Warsaw
Krasinsky, Volgograd Oblast, rural locality in Solontsovskoye Rural Settlement, Russia
The Legend of Madame Krasinska, 1903 book of Vernon Lee
Karasiński

Polish-language surnames